Jadarion Johntavian better known as J. D. Harmon (born January 18, 1994) is an American football safety who is currently a free agent. He signed with the Cleveland Browns as an undrafted free agent in 2017. He played college football at Kentucky.

Professional career
Harmon signed with the Cleveland Browns as an undrafted free agent on May 4, 2017. He was waived on 1st September, 2017 during roster cutdowns.

References

External links
Kentucky Wildcats bio

1994 births
Living people
American football cornerbacks
Kentucky Wildcats football players
Paducah Tilghman High School alumni
Sportspeople from Paducah, Kentucky
Cleveland Browns players